Westdene Stadium, also known as Westdene Sports Ground, is a multi-use stadium in Bloemfontein, Free State, South Africa. It is currently used mostly for football matches and is the home ground of Roses United F.C. and Celtic Colts F.C.

External links
Picture of Westdene Stadium

Sports venues in the Free State (province)
Soccer venues in South Africa
Buildings and structures in Bloemfontein